Guna Airlines Pvt. Ltd. is an airline based in Nepal operating domestic scheduled flights from its base at Tribhuvan International Airport. Guna Airlines was initially formed in 2009, when it was part of the Guna Group a Nepalese conglomerate of companies. After ceasing operations in 2013 and transferring its operations to Simrik Airlines, the airline restarted operations in 2021 while retransferring operations back into the initial airline company.

History
The Guna Group began as a small gold shop known as Guna Jewellers in Patan in 1984 and has since grown to a multi-industry company. In 2009, the group launched Guna Airlines.

In 2013, Guna Airlines ceased trading due to financial difficulties and was acquired by Simrik Airlines for NRs 350 million. Simrik Airlines used the Brand of Guna for some more time before renaming and repainting the two Beechcraft 1900 aircraft, that were previously operated by Guna Airlines.

In 2020, first reports appeared stating that Guna Airlines would be reestablished. In early 2021, the airline announced that it would buy five BAe Jetstream 41 from Yeti Airlines to restart operation under the brand name Guna Airlines. For this, chairman Rajendra Shakya invested 1 billion Nepali Rupees into the company.

On 16 September 2021, operations began again with regular flights from Kathmandu to Pokhara and Bharatpur, after which it gradually increased its network.

In early 2023, the Civil Aviation Authority of Nepal suspended all operations of the airline as it was unable to pay salaries of its staff. Later, the authority also stopped any aircraft sale of the company.

Destinations 
Guna Airlines offers scheduled flights to the following destinations, all of which are suspended as of March 2023:

In its previous iteration, Guna Airlines also operated scheduled mountain sightseeing flights from Kathmandu to Mount Everest.

Fleet

Current Fleet
Guna Airlines' fleet consists of the following aircraft (as of October 2021):

References

External links
  via Wayback Machine

Defunct airlines of Nepal
Airlines established in 2009
2009 establishments in Nepal
2013 disestablishments in Nepal